North Dakota Highway 10 (ND 10) is a  east–west state highway in the U.S. state of North Dakota. It is an unsigned state highway. ND 10's western terminus is at Interstate 94 (I-94) and U.S. Route 52 (US 52) southwest of Casselton, and the eastern terminus is at I-94 and US 52 in West Fargo. The highway was formerly part of U.S. Route 10 (US 10).

Major intersections

References

010
Transportation in Cass County, North Dakota
West Fargo, North Dakota